The Aesthetic Group Gymnastics World Championships are the world championships for the sport of aesthetic group gymnastics. Aesthetic Group Gymnastics is a discipline not currently recognized by the Fédération Internationale de Gymnastique. World Championships are organized annually since 2000 by the International Federation of Aesthetic Group Gymnastics (IFAGG).

Categories
World Championships are organized every year for both Juniors and Seniors at the same time. Each gymnast can compete in only one of the following categories:

 World Championships Junior
 World Championships Senior
 IFAGG Trophy Mixed Junior
 IFAGG Trophy Mixed Senior
 IFAGG Trophy Short Program Junior
 IFAGG Trophy Short Program Senior
 IFAGG Trophy Short Program Mixed Junior
 IFAGG Trophy Short Program Mixed Senior

Note Mixed teams are made of female gymnasts with at least one male gymnast.

Editions

Medalists

Senior

Junior
Note: First Junior World Championship event was held in 2005.

All-time medal table

2000-2022
 Last updated after the 2022 World Aesthetic Gymnastics Championships

Team competition

Senior
Note: Awarding ceremony for country ranking has been organized since 2011.

Junior

Country competition medal table

2000-2019
 Last updated after the 2019 World Aesthetic Gymnastics Championships

External links
 International Federation of Aesthetic Group Gymnastics

References

 
Aesthetic group gymnastics
Recurring sporting events established in 2000